On 21 February 2016, two car bombs struck exploded in the predominantly Alawite neighborhood of al-Zahra in Homs, Syria. The bombings killed at least 57 people and injured more than 100 others. At least 60 surrounding buildings and dozens of cars were destroyed in the blasts.

Bombings
The bombings occurred during the Sunday morning rush hour on the Sixtieth Street. The initial death toll was 34, but rose due to the number of people critically injured. According to a Syrian government television channel, they targeted students and government employees going to work. Dozens of vehicles were destroyed and a number of nearby buildings were damaged. It aimed supporters of the government at a time when it was making significant military gains. 

The bombings occurred on the same day as bombings in the Damascus suburb of Sayyidah Zaynab that killed at least 30. The attacks in Homs and Damascus were claimed by the Islamic State of Iraq and the Levant.

Bombings in Homs in January 2016 had killed 22 people.

See also
 February 2016 Sayyidah Zaynab bombings

References 

Homs
Massacres in 2016
Mass murder in 2016
Persecution of Alawites
Terrorist incidents in Syria in 2016
ISIL terrorist incidents in Syria
Islamic terrorist incidents in 2016
Massacres of the Syrian civil war perpetrated by ISIL
February 2016 crimes in Asia
Massacres of the Syrian civil war in 2016
February 2016 events in Syria